Freelance Animators was an animation studio based in Auckland, New Zealand that was founded in 1989. The studio even had a school where people in New Zealand could learn animation called, Freelance Animation School. In 2012, the school was renamed Animation College. Though the school still exists today, the studio has since shut down.

Shows
They worked on the following TV shows:

Tiny Toon Adventures (1990–1992) - 3 half-hour episodes: Rainy Daze, Brave Tales of Real Rabbits and Toons Take Over.
Darkwing Duck (1991) - 1 half-hour episode: Heavy Mental.
Goof Troop (1992) - 1 half-hour episode: Meanwhile, Back at the Ramp.
Animaniacs (1993–1994) - 14 segments: When Rita Met Runt, The Cat and the Fiddle, Moby or Not Moby, Chalkboard Bungle, What A Dump!, Survey Ladies, Nighty-Night Toon, General Boo-Regard, Up A Tree, Of Nice and Men, The Mindy 500, Buttons and the Balloon, Broken Date and The Blemish. Also numerous bumpers.
Taz-Mania (1994) - 2 segments: Driving Mr. Taz, Mean Bear.

New Zealand animation studios
Film production companies of New Zealand

References